The Dawro are a people of southern Ethiopia, also known as the Omete. They speak the Dawragna language.

During the nineteenth century, the Dawro lived in an independent state known as the Kingdom of Dawro. In 2000, the Dawro Zone was split off from the former Semien Omo Zone in the Southern Nations, Nationalities, and People's Region. It consists of the woredas of Isara Tocha, Loma Bosa, and Mareka Gena.

References 
 Ethnologue
 
 World Statesmen.org

Ethnic groups in Ethiopia
Omotic-speaking peoples